Tracheloptychus madagascariensis, commonly known as the Madagascar keeled cordylid, is a species of lizard in the family Gerrhosauridae.
The species is found in Madagascar.

References

Tracheloptychus
Reptiles described in 1854
Reptiles of Madagascar
Taxa named by Wilhelm Peters
Endemic fauna of Madagascar